Henri Blaffart (22 June 1965 – 21 March 2008) was a Belgian conservationist and environmentalist.

Biography 

Henri Blaffart graduated from the Faculty of Agronomic Science of Gembloux in Belgium in 1990 with a degree in agronomy, with an emphasis on forests and water. Blaffart began working on various conservation projects throughout the world following his graduation, including Ethiopia, Cambodia, Samoa and Papua New Guinea before moving to New Caledonia.

Blaffart began working on a Conservation International project, the  Mont Panié Special Botanical Reserve project in New Caledonia, in 2002. He officially joined Conservation International in 2006 as the Mont Panié project chief. Blaffart worked with the Kanak communities on the environmental management of Mont Panié, which is located in New Caledonia's North Province. He actively worked with a number of New Caledonian organizations to protect the Mont Panié reserve, including the government of North Province, the Dayu Biik Association, which comprises local Kanak tribes, the Caledonian Institute of Agronomy and other scientific, social and governmental organizations.

Henri Blaffart was swept away and accidentally drowned while trying to cross the Tiendanite River in North Province on 21 March 2008. He was 42 years old and was survived by his mother and sister, who both reside in Belgium.

References

External links 
 Pacific Magazine: Floods Kill Two In New Caledonia

1965 births
2008 deaths
Belgian conservationists
Belgian emigrants to New Caledonia
Deaths by drowning
Accidental deaths in New Caledonia
Belgian emigrants to France